Kamar Boneh (also known as Kamarbūneh) is a village in Samen Rural District, Samen District, Malayer County, Hamadan Province, Iran. At the 2006 census, its population was 84, in 27 families.

References 

Populated places in Malayer County